Santo Antônio do Amparo is a city in the southern part of the state of Minas Gerais, Brazil. The population is 18,613 (2020 est.) in an area of 488.89 km². The municipality was founded in 1938.

Notable residents
 Hélio Garcia, former Governor of Minas Gerais, born in Santo Antônio do Amparo

References

External links
http://www.citybrazil.com.br/mg/stoantonioamparo/ (in Portuguese)

Municipalities in Minas Gerais